A vendetta knife is a type of dagger associated with the vendetta, the traditional feuds of Corsica.

References

Daggers
Corsican culture